La Serre might refer to:

 Jean Puget de la Serre (1594-1665), writer and dramatist
 Jean-Louis-Ignace de La Serre (1662-1757), writer and dramatist
 Charles Barbier de la Serre (1767-1841), cryptographer
 La Serre, commune in the department of Aveyron, France
 La Serre-Bussière-Vieille, commune in the department of Creuse, France
 La Serre, pen name of Simon-Joseph Pellegrin

See also 
 Lasserre (disambiguation)
 Serre (disambiguation)